The 1995–96 Louisville Cardinals men's basketball team represented the University of Louisville in the 1995–96 NCAA Division I men's basketball season. The head coach was Denny Crum and the team finished the season with an overall record of 22–12.

Schedule and results

|-
!colspan=9 style=| Regular Season

|-
!colspan=9 style=| NCAA Tournament

References 

Louisville Cardinals men's basketball seasons
Louisville
Louisville
Louisville Cardinals men's basketball, 1995-96
Louisville Cardinals men's basketball, 1995-96